Emilio Guinea López (13 May 1907 in Oleaveaga, Bilbao – 26 October 1985 in Madrid) was a Spanish botanist.

He graduated in 1929, and was awarded his doctorate in 1932 in Natural Sciences in the "Central University of Madrid" (now the Complutense University of Madrid.

He made numerous expeditions to tropical Africa, with an emphasis on Equatorial Guinea.

In 1957 he became Curator of the Royal Botanical Garden of Madrid.

Both his library and his personal herbarium were donated to the Royal Botanical Garden of Madrid, which named him Honorary Director.

Some publications

References

Sources 
Teixidó, F. Biólogos Españoles, on line

External links 
In memorian, Emilio Guinea López from RJB
Photo of Emilio Guinea, from euskomedia.org

1907 births
1985 deaths
20th-century Spanish botanists
Spanish explorers
People from Bilbao
Pteridologists
Mycologists